Bùi Tấn Trường (born 19 February 1986) is a Vietnamese professional footballer who plays as a goalkeeper for V.League 1 club Hà Nội. Trained at Đồng Tháp since a 13-year-old boy, he became first goalkeeper of the club in 2007. In the same year, he scored a goal in the 2-2 draw with Đồng Tâm Long An F.C. in V-League 2007.

In 2008, Bùi Tấn Trường was a member of Vietnam U22 squad which won Merdeka Cup after beating hosts Malaysia in the final. He also stopped a penalty shoot of Malaysia in that game. Bùi Tấn Trường made his debut for Vietnam national football team in the 0-0 draw with Syria in 2009. In March 2010, he signed a record deal with his club Đồng Tháp F.C.  to make him the most expensive goalkeeper of V-League. On December 8, 2010, he played excellently for Vietnam national football team in the important 1-0 victory over Singapore at the AFF Suzuki Cup 2010, which allowed the Vietnam national football team to occupy first place in Group B and advance to the semifinal round.

Club career

TĐCS Đồng Tháp 
2007 V-League was the first professional season's Trường was being stood in first team of Đồng Tháp, equal to Thanh Bình, Quý Sửu, Việt Cường... In the match against Đồng Tâm Long An in match-day 16, Tan Truong even help his team drawn, with goals as a striker, when he was involved in additional time.

Xuân Thành Sài Gòn F.C. 
Truong signed to play with Sài Gòn F.C. in the winter of 2011.

International career  
Vietnam Olympic coach, as well as national team, from Alfred Riedl (2007) to Henrique Calisto (2008–2011), were conquered by Trường. The wonderful matches, the phase thwarts as utopian of the game for the club, Trường was selected to the national team without much discussion. From being the third choice in the  Vietnam U23 team at 2007 SEA Games was held in Thailand (after Đức Cường and Vĩnh Lợi), he was promoted to the first position after just two years, at the 2009 SEA Games that was held in Laos. Trường has also been selected for the starting list of national team kit, under the head coach Henrique Calisto, for a few matches.

Honours 

Đồng Tháp
V.League 2: 2006

Xuân Thành Sài Gòn
Vietnamese National Cup: 2012

Becamex Bình Dương
V.League 1: 2014, 2015
Vietnamese National Cup: 2015, 2018
Vietnamese Super Cup: 2014, 2015

Hà Nội
V.League 1: 2022
Vietnamese National Cup: 2020, 2022
Vietnamese Super Cup: 2020

Vietnam 
AFF Championship Third place: 2010

Individual
  Vietnamese Bronze Ball  : 2009

References

1986 births
Living people
People from Đồng Tháp Province
Vietnamese footballers
Vietnam international footballers
Xuan Thanh Saigon Cement FC players
Becamex Binh Duong FC players
Hanoi FC players
V.League 1 players
Association football goalkeepers
Footballers at the 2010 Asian Games
Dong Thap FC players
Asian Games competitors for Vietnam